The Return of Jafar (sometimes marketed as Aladdin: The Return of Jafar on re-release) is a 1994 American direct-to-video animated musical fantasy film produced by Walt Disney Pictures and Television. It is the first sequel to the 1992 film Aladdin, and serves as the pilot to the Aladdin animated series (being an origin story of how the series began as it premiered before this film). Released on May 20, 1994 in North America, it was the second Disney animated film sequel after The Rescuers Down Under (1990) and the first Disney direct-to-video animated film, and marked the first American direct-to-video animated film. Gilbert Gottfried, Jonathan Freeman, Scott Weinger, Frank Welker, and Linda Larkin reprise their roles from the first film, with Jason Alexander, Val Bettin, Liz Callaway, and Dan Castellaneta joining in the cast.

Plot
One year has passed since the events of the first film. Aladdin and Abu have settled in the palace of Agrabah with Princess Jasmine and her father, the Sultan. Still yearning for adventures, Aladdin foils a criminal group led by the dimwitted Abis Mal and returns their stolen loot to the people of Agrabah. Meanwhile, in the desert, Iago escapes from Jafar's lamp. Tired of being taken for granted, Iago refuses Jafar's demands to free him. After dropping the lamp into a well, Iago returns to Agrabah, hoping to befriend Aladdin and return to the palace. During a confrontation with Aladdin and Abu, the three are attacked by Abis Mal and his henchmen; Iago inadvertently saves Aladdin's life. In gratitude, Aladdin keeps Iago on the palace grounds, promising to speak with the Sultan on Iago's behalf.

Meanwhile, Abis Mal finds Jafar's lamp in the well. Hindered by his incompetent new master, Jafar manipulates Abis Mal into wasting his first two wishes, then enlists his help in taking revenge on Aladdin. In exchange he will grant him a special third wish. Abis Mal agrees, also desiring revenge on Aladdin. Meanwhile, the Genie returns to the palace after traveling the world for one year, though his powers are diminished now that he is free from the lamp. At the evening banquet, the Sultan announces Aladdin as the new Royal Vizier. Abu and Rajah discover Iago in the garden and chase him into the banquet. Aladdin asks the Sultan to pardon Iago, but Jasmine is livid that Aladdin never confided in her. The Sultan remains suspicious, however, but issues Iago a temporary pardon, with the stipulation that Aladdin watch over him. Genie and Iago help persuade Jasmine to forgive Aladdin for keeping Iago a secret and agrees to give Iago a chance. However, Jafar sneaks into the palace and forces Iago to trick Aladdin and the Sultan to travel to a waterfall.

During the trip, the Sultan eventually forgives Aladdin, but Jafar, having transformed into a gang of sorcerer horsemen riding dragon-winged horses ambushes them, sending Aladdin into the waterfall and capturing the Sultan, with Jasmine, Genie and Abu also caught and locked in the dungeon. Aladdin eventually makes his way back to Agrabah to warn Razoul, but Jafar, posing as Jasmine, frames Aladdin for the Sultan's alleged murder and sentences him to execution. Feeling guilty for his betrayal, Iago frees the Genie, who saves Aladdin. Jafar now controls Agrabah, but Aladdin vows to stop him and Genie reveals Jafar can be killed by destroying his lamp. Iago decides to leave, but not before Aladdin thanks him.

Aladdin and the group confront Jafar in the treasure room just before Abis Mal can wish him free. However, Jafar knocks both Aladdin and Abis Mal out the tower and sends them hurtling through the Palace trees; and Abis Mal drops Jafar's lamp. Aladdin frees himself, and the group attempts to get the lamp, but Jafar transforms into his Genie form, scares the group, knocks the Genie out and shatters the Carpet. He splits open the Palace gardens, creating a pool of lava and traps Aladdin on a sinking rock. Iago, who has once again had a change of heart, realized that he had been tricked by Jafar. returns and grabs the lamp, but is knocked out by Jafar. Though injured, he kicks the lamp into the lava, and Aladdin rescues Iago as Jafar's magic is undone, making Jafar self-destroy and restoring the Palace gardens and the Carpet, but Iago's injuries are so severe that for a moment everybody believes him dead but he's alive. Everyone forgives Iago and he is officially accepted into the palace. Aladdin ultimately rejects the Sultan's offer to become the Vizier, instead opting to see the world with Jasmine, much to Iago's chagrin.

In a post-credits scene, Abis Mal, still dangling from the tree, realizes he'll never get his third wish.

Voice cast

 Gilbert Gottfried as Iago
 Jason Alexander as Abis Mal
 Jonathan Freeman as Jafar
 Scott Weinger as Aladdin
 Brad Kane as Aladdin (singing voice)
 Linda Larkin as Princess Jasmine
 Liz Callaway as Princess Jasmine (singing voice)
 Dan Castellaneta as Genie
 Frank Welker as Abu and Rajah
 Val Bettin as the Sultan
 Jim Cummings as Razoul

Additional voices are provided by Jeff Bennett and B. J. Ward.

Production
Following the success of The Little Mermaid (1989), Walt Disney Television Animation subsequently produced an animated television series of the same name that aired on CBS. At the same time, The Disney Afternoon had become a success with television series such as DuckTales and Chip 'n Dale: Rescue Rangers airing in a syndicated two-hour time slot. Before the theatrical release of Aladdin, Disney commissioned Tad Stones and Alan Zaslove to produce an animated series of Aladdin that would shepherd its transition from the movie into a television series.

While conceiving the sequel, Stones became fascinated with the character Iago, commenting that "I said 'I want the parrot in there,' but he was trapped in the lamp [at the end of the Aladdin movie], so we came up with a story of how he got out and ended up with Aladdin." As common with half-hour animated television series at the time, Disney initially planned to begin the series with an hour-long television special, but Stones suggested that the film should instead be released on home video. The idea was initially met with some resistance from then-Disney Feature Animation president Peter Schneider and then-Disney CEO Michael Eisner who felt it would cheapen Disney's brand. Ultimately, layout designer Paul Felix conceived the film's opening with the gang of thieves entering into a cave, which was then later animated at Disney Animation Australia. Impressed with the animation dailies, then-Disney chairman Jeffrey Katzenberg allowed for the first half to be animated in Australia while the climax was animated in Japan.

Due to a well publicized bitter fall-out over the use of his voice in the marketing campaign for Aladdin, Robin Williams refused to reprise the role of the Genie, and was instead replaced by Dan Castellaneta (best known for voicing Homer Simpson). Stones also claimed that Williams participated in selecting Castellaneta to voice the Genie. It was also the first Aladdin full-length production without the original voice of Sultan, Douglas Seale. He was replaced by Val Bettin, who had previously worked with Disney on The Great Mouse Detective and who would reprise his role in the franchise's animated series and Aladdin and the King of Thieves.

Songs

Release
Instead of the film receiving a theatrical release, Steve Feldstein, director of public relations for Disney's home video division, stated the decision to release The Return of Jafar on home video was due to time constraints claiming that "to put the film in the theatrical pipeline would have taken up to five years", but releasing it on home video would take "less than two years." In addition to that, Feldstein confirmed that financing was also a consideration since producing a direct-to-video feature would be "less costly to make than Aladdin." Likewise, due to an expanding video market, Disney claimed demand from theatrical and video audiences for Aladdin and other characters was another reason for a speedy follow-up.

Home media
The Return of Jafar was first released on VHS and LaserDisc in the United States and Canada on May 20, 1994, being the first installment of Walt Disney Home Video collection series. In its first two days, it sold more than 1.5 million VHS copies; more than 4.6 million VHS copies were sold in less than a week. In the United States, more than ten million copies were sold, ranking among the top 15 top-selling videos of all time (at the time), earning $150 million in profits. The film eventually sold 15million units and grossed approximately $300million worldwide. The sequel's success removed what Los Angeles Times described as "the low-quality stigma" from direct-to-video, and caused Disney, Universal Pictures, and other studios to release more direct-to-video films.

Originally released on VHS that year, The Return of Jafar was later reissued on Special Edition DVD and VHS (with "Aladdin:" added to the title) on January 18, 2005, the same day as its direct sequel, Aladdin and the King of Thieves, also received a re-release, with digitally restored picture and remastered sound. The Special Edition DVD, along with the other two films in the series, were placed on moratorium ("placed back into the Disney Vault") on January 31, 2008, in the United States, and February 4, 2008, in the United Kingdom. The Return of Jafar, along with Aladdin and the King of Thieves was released on Blu-ray/DVD/Digital HD Combo Pack on January 5, 2016, as a Disney Movie Club exclusive in North America.

Reception
On the review aggregator website Rotten Tomatoes, the film has an overall approval rating of 33% based on 12 reviews collected, with a weighted average score of 4.3/10.

David Nusair of Reelfilm.com summed up most of the negative feelings that contributed to this rating:

Despite the mostly negative reception, on the television program Siskel & Ebert, the film received a "two thumbs up" from Gene Siskel and Roger Ebert. Writing for Entertainment Weekly, Steve Daly graded the sequel a C− criticizing it as a "knockoff" that "carries the Disney label and costs about as much as a tape of Aladdin, but it's clear from the first jerky frame that the same time, care, and creativity didn't go into it."

Adaptations

Comic
When Disney was publishing their own comics in the mid-90s, they produced a two-issue Aladdin comic presenting an alternate version of The Return of Jafar. It was titled The Return of Aladdin. The comic is introduced by the Merchant from the first film.

The story starts off showing that Aladdin has been particularly bored of palace life. Meanwhile, Jafar has escaped the Cave of Wonders. Iago is given the task of finding the right master for Jafar to manipulate. Their search seems hopeless as some people are able to enjoy all three wishes or messing up. They find someone to use the lamp, who is known as Isabella, a master magician. Isabella is similar in appearance to Jafar (except his clothing is green). His first wish is to return to Agrabah Palace (as he performed entertainment to the sultan in #1). His second wish is for an army of soldiers to pursue Aladdin and Jasmine when they catch on to Jafar's presence. He is persuaded to use his third wish to trap Jafar and Iago in the lamp again, sending them back to the cave. Due to persuasion by the Genie, the Sultan hires Isabella to a permanent entertainment job at the palace. The end of the story shows the merchant having a black lamp similar to Jafar's, but he claims it to be worthless.

Video game
The plot of the film is loosely used in Agrabah, one of the worlds in Kingdom Hearts II, and the Peddler appears from the first film. As in the film, Iago escapes from Jafar and does his best to respect Aladdin, Jasmine, Sora, Donald and Goofy, although Jafar coerces him into aiding him in his revenge, almost damaging Iago's friendship with Aladdin and Sora, but he redeems himself after taking a blow for Aladdin which almost claims his life. The Peddler, at the beginning, comes across Jafar's lamp, but sells it to Aladdin, Sora, Donald and Goofy for a rare artifact in the Cave of Wonders. Despite Aladdin sealing the lamp in the palace dungeon, the greedy Peddler breaks into the dungeon and frees Jafar, unleashing his fury on Agrabah until he is defeated by Sora and company. The Peddler's fate is left ambiguous. This was the first Disney sequel to have its plot adapted into a level in the Kingdom Hearts series, which was then followed by the Grid being an adaptation of Tron Legacy, and the Caribbean being one of Pirates of the Caribbean: At World's End.

Furthermore, there is a mild allusion to the Agrabah boss battle in Kingdom Hearts. Sora must fight Jafar in Genie form, surrounded by a lava pit with raising and lowering levels, while Iago flies above with Jafar's lamp. Only striking the lamp has any effect on Jafar's health. This fight also takes place in the second game, Kingdom Hearts: Chain of Memories, and its PlayStation 2 remake. In both versions of Chain of Memories, the boss fight is due to the majority of the game being illusions created from Sora's memories. A second playable character, Riku, also fights the boss in his mode. The battle is once again visited in Kingdom Hearts Coded and Kingdom Hearts Re:coded.

Follow-ups
The film was followed by a television series titled Aladdin, which served as the overall third installment, and another direct-to-video sequel, Aladdin and the King of Thieves, which was released in 1996. The franchise was later re-visited in "Hercules and the Arabian Night", a crossover episode with Hercules, and in Disney Princess Enchanted Tales: Follow Your Dreams.

References

External links

Aladdin (franchise)
1994 films
1994 animated films
1994 direct-to-video films
1990s American animated films
1994 fantasy films
1990s musical films
American children's animated adventure films
American children's animated fantasy films
American children's animated musical films
American fantasy adventure films
Animated films about revenge
American sequel films
American television series premieres
Animated films about magic
Australian animated feature films
Australian sequel films
Direct-to-video fantasy films
Direct-to-video sequel films
Disney direct-to-video animated films
DisneyToon Studios animated films
1990s English-language films
English-language Japanese films
American fantasy comedy films
Films based on Aladdin
Genies in film
Films adapted into comics
Disney Television Animation films
Films with screenplays by Duane Capizzi
Films scored by Mark Watters
Television films as pilots
Films set in palaces
Films directed by Tad Stones
Japanese animated films
Japanese sequel films
Films set in the Middle Ages